Pycnoneura is a genus of moths in the family Geometridae. It is considered by some to be a synonym of Chrysotaenia.

References

Oenochrominae